Paul Turin is a retired U.S. soccer goalkeeper who played professionally in the Major Indoor Soccer League and North American Soccer League.

Youth
Turin graduated from Christian Brothers College High School.  He then began his collegiate career with St. Louis Community College-Meramec where he was a 1976 First Team and 1977 Honorable Mention (third team) National Junior College Athletic Association All American soccer player.  In 1978, he was one of six players from STLCC-Meramec who transferred to the University of South Carolina.  He played the 1978 and 1979 college soccer seasons with the Gamecocks.  He has the third lowest goals against average in Gamecocks history.

Professional
In 1979, he signed with the St. Louis Steamers of the Major Indoor Soccer League.  He played eighteen games and had the fourth lowest goals against average that season.  In December 1979, the Tulsa Roughnecks of the North American Soccer League selected Turin with the first pick of the second round of the 1979 draft.  He played the 1980 outdoor and 1980–1981 indoor seasons with the Roughnecks.

References

External links
 NASL/MISL stats

1957 births
Living people
American soccer players
Major Indoor Soccer League (1978–1992) players
North American Soccer League (1968–1984) indoor players
North American Soccer League (1968–1984) players
Soccer players from St. Louis
South Carolina Gamecocks men's soccer players
St. Louis Steamers (original MISL) players
Tulsa Roughnecks (1978–1984) players
Association football goalkeepers